Rubus verae-crucis is a Mexican species of brambles in the rose family. It has been found only in the States of Oaxaca and Veracruz in Mexico.

Rubus verae-crucis is an erect perennial with gray wool and a few scattered curved prickles. Leaves are compound with 3 or 5 leaflets. Flowers are white.

References

verae-crucis
Flora of Oaxaca
Flora of Veracruz
Plants described in 1913